Dennis-Yerai Eckert Ayensa (born 9 January 1997) is a German professional footballer who plays for Royale Union Saint-Gilloise as a forward.

Club career

Early career
Eckert was born in Bonn to a Galician mother and a German father with Iranian roots. He joined Borussia Mönchengladbach's youth setup in 2013, after stints at Alemannia Aachen, 1. FC Köln and SC Pulheim. He made his senior debut with the former's reserve team on 5 September 2015, playing the last five minutes in a 2–2 Regionalliga home draw against SSVG Velbert.

Celta Vigo
On 4 July 2017, Eckert joined Celta de Vigo and was initially assigned to the B-team in Segunda División B. He made his first-team debut on 18 August of the following year, coming on as a late substitute for Maxi Gómez in a 1–1 home draw against RCD Espanyol.

Loan to Excelsior
On 31 January 2019, Eckert joined Eredivisie side SBV Excelsior until June. He scored the game-winning goal on 17 February in a 2–1 comeback win against FC Emmen for his first top-flight goal.

FC Ingolstadt
On 2 September 2019, FC Ingolstadt announced the signing of Eckert. He scored a goal and provided an assist in his debut for the club on 15 September 2019. Eckert finished the season with 14 goals in 30 league matches, helping Ingolstadt reach the promotion play-offs. Eckert helped Ingolstadt reach the promotion play-offs again the following season, leading Ingolstadt to the 2. Bundesliga.

Royale Union Saint-Gilloise
On 20 June 2022, Eckert signed for Belgian side Union SG ahead of their 2022–23 season after scoring 25 goals and providing 15 assists in 78 league matches for Ingolstadt. He scored his first goal for Union in a pre-season match against Feyenoord on 16 July 2022. Eckert made his Belgian league debut on 23 July 2022 in their opening match against Sint-Truiden. He made his senior UEFA competition debut on 9 August 2022 in a 2022–23 UEFA Champions League qualification match against Scottish side Rangers. He scored his first league goal in his following match on 31 August 2022 against Royal Antwerp at the Bosuilstadion.

International career

Youth
Eckert has played for the Germany U19 national team.

Career statistics

References

External links

1997 births
Living people
Sportspeople from Bonn
German footballers
Iranian footballers
Spanish footballers
German people of Spanish descent
German people of Iranian descent
Sportspeople of Iranian descent
Footballers from North Rhine-Westphalia
Association football forwards
Germany youth international footballers
Regionalliga players
Segunda División B players
La Liga players
Eredivisie players
3. Liga players
2. Bundesliga players
Belgian Pro League players
Borussia Mönchengladbach II players
Celta de Vigo B players
RC Celta de Vigo players
Excelsior Rotterdam players
FC Ingolstadt 04 players
Royale Union Saint-Gilloise players
German expatriate footballers
German expatriate sportspeople in Spain
Expatriate footballers in Spain
German expatriate sportspeople in the Netherlands
Expatriate footballers in the Netherlands
German expatriate sportspeople in Belgium
Expatriate footballers in Belgium